The SCMS Journal of Indian Management is a peer-reviewed academic journal published by the School of Communication and Management Studies (Cochin, India). The journal publishes research papers largely focused on business, management, and accountancy.

Though many of its articles examine issues related to India, the journal is not exclusively India-focused. Its founder and editor-in-chief is G.P.C. Nayar (Chairman, SCMS Group of Educational Institutions).

The journal has been published since 2004. All articles and issues till date are freely downloadable.

Abstracting and indexing 
The journal is abstracted and indexed in Scopus, EBSCO databases, and in ProQuest databases.

References

External links 
 

Publications established in 2004
Quarterly journals
Business and management journals
English-language journals
Open access journals